Abacetus archambaulti is a species of ground beetle in the subfamily Pterostichinae. It was described by Straneo in 1955 and is found in Chad, Cote d'Ivoire and Mauritania.

References

archambaulti
Beetles described in 1955
Insects of West Africa
Insects of Central Africa